Ajay Kumar Sood  (born 26 June 1951) is an Indian physicist, researcher and is serving as the 4th Principal Scientific Adviser to the Government of India. He is also holder of 2 US and 5 Indian patents, known for his pioneering research findings on graphene and nanotechnology. He is a Distinguished Honorary Professor of Physics at Indian Institute of Science, Bangalore. The Government of India honoured him in 2013, with the Padma Shri, the fourth highest civilian award, for his contributions to the fields of science and technology. Sood was elected a Fellow of the Royal Society (FRS) in 2015. He has been on the Physical Sciences jury for the Infosys Prize from 2019.

Biography

Ajay Kumar was born on 26 June 1951, in Gwalior, India, into a Sood family. He graduated in Physics (BSc Hons) from the Punjab University, Chandigarh, in 1971, and followed it with a master's degree, (MSc Hons) a year later, from the same university. In 1973, he joined the Indira Gandhi Centre for Atomic Research, Kalpakkam, as a scientist where he worked till 1988. During this period, he enrolled for research at the Indian Institute of Science from where he obtained his PhD, in 1982. He also did post doctoral research at the Max Planck Institute für Festkörperforschung, Stuttgart, Germany, from 1983 to 1985.

The Indian Institute of Science offered Sood the post of an associate professor at the institution in 1988, which he accepted. In 1994, he was promoted as the Professor of the Department of Physics at IISc. Four years later, he rose to the position of the chairman of the Division of Physical and Mathematical Sciences, IISc, which he held until 2008. Sood has also been holding the position of the honorary professor at the Jawaharlal Nehru Centre for Advanced Scientific Research, Bengaluru since 1993.

Sood lives in Bengaluru, Karnataka state, India, associating himself with the Indian Institute of Science and the Jawaharlal Nehru Centre for Advanced Scientific Research.

Research and legacy
Sood has done extensive research on hard condensed matter and soft condensed matter physics, with special emphasis on Raman scattering and nanotechnology. He has been credited with many path breaking findings and inventions, which are said to be of daily and scientific uses.

Sood Effect
Sood, through his experiments in 2003, generated electrical signals by passing liquids over solids or through nanotubes and this phenomenon has now been termed by the scientific world as Sood Effect.

Research on resonance Raman studies
Sood, along with his team of scientists at the Indian Institute of Science, has done experiments on semiconductor super lattices, fullerenes, solid C60, C70 and single walled carbon nanotubes and reported to have unearthed new concepts on optical phonons. He was successful in exciting squeezed phonon states in KTa03 crystals, reported to be for the first time, by using femtosecond laser pulses and employing impulsive simulated Raman scattering. He has also discovered that liquid flow in a singled walled carbon nanotube induces the voltage and current to flow along the floor direction of the tube.

Other research efforts
Sood has also experimented with soft condensed matter like micelle composed viscoelastic gels which establish a deterministic spatiotemporal chaotic dynamics in the nonlinear flow regime. He has also invented an ultrasensitive immunoassay by subjecting colloids to an electrical field, thus generating nonequilibrium phenomena, an invention that has relevance to the medical field. He has developed a medical diagnostic kit, too, which is said to be useful for the diagnosis of diseases across the spectrum.

Sood is now working on the modalities of enhancing the viscosity of a material by adding nanotubes without increasing its weight. This will, for example, enable us to make lighter weight bullet proof vests with increased efficiency.

Academic fellowships and positions
Sood is a fellow of many science academies and institutions such as the Indian Academy of Sciences (FASc) (1991), the Indian National Science Academy (FNA) (1996), The World Academy of Sciences (FTWAS) (2002) and the National Academy of Sciences, India (FNASc) (1995) and holds the Bhatnagar Chair of the Council of Scientific and Industrial Research. He is the incumbent Secretary General of The World Academy of Sciences and a former President of the Indian Academy of Sciences from 2010 to 2012 and the Vice-President of the Indian National Science Academy from 2008 to 2010. He also served as a member of the Asia-Pacific Academy of Materials in 2008.

Sood is an executive editor of the international journal, Solid State Communications, with a SCImago Journal Rank (SJR) of 0.874.
 

He is also an editorial board member of the journals, Scientific Reports, Particle and EPL (Europhysics Letters).

Sood has also served on the scientific advisory committee to the Prime Minister of India from 2009 to 2014, and is the Chairman of the National Physical Laboratory, New Delhi.

Awards and recognitions
Sood is a recipient of many awards and honours. He was awarded Shanti Swarup Bhatnagar Prize, in 1990, by the Government of India. In 2013, the Government of India followed it up with the fourth highest civilian award, Padma Shri.

The Third World Academy of Sciences (TWAS) recognised Sood's services by conferring on him the TWAS Prize in Physics, in 2000. The same year, he received four more awards viz. G. D. Birla Science Award,  Federation of Indian Chambers of Commerce and Industry (FICCI) Award, Materials Research Society (India) Medal and Millennium Gold Medal of Indian Science Congress. Two years later, in 2002, he received the Homi Jehangir Bhabha Medal of Indian National Science Academy. The next year, in 2003, he was selected for the Indian Institute of Science (IISc) Alumni Award for Excellence in Research for Science. Three more awards came his way the same year, viz.
M. N. Saha Birth Centenary Award of the Indian Science Congress, Sir C. V. Raman Award of the University Grants Commission and the Goyal Prize in Physics. he has also received awards such as:

 DAE Raja Ramanna Award – Jawaharlal Nehru Centre for Advanced Scientific Research −2005
 National Award in Nanoscience and Nanotechnology – [[Department of Science and Technology (India)|Department of Science and Technology]], Government of India – 2006
 Lifetime achievement award – Punjab University, Chandigarh – 2006
 Bhatnagar Fellowship – Council of Scientific and Industrial Research – 2007
 Vigyan Ratan Award – Punjab University, Chandigarh – 2010
 H. K. Firodia Award in Science and Technology – 2010
 Bangalore Nano Award – Government of Karnataka – 2010
 G. M. Modi Award for Science – 2012
 Indian Science Congress Award for outstanding contributions to Science – 2014
 R. D. Birla Award for excellence in Physics – Indian Physics Association – 2014

Sood was elected a Fellow of the Royal Society (FRS) in 2015.

Publications

Sood has published over 290 research articles and papers in national and international peer reviewed journals. His articles have been published in book format, too. A random selection of his articles are:
 Phonon interference in BaTiO 3: High-pressure Raman study
 Spatiotemporal rheochaos in nematic hydrodynamics
 Origin of the unusual dependence of Raman D band on excitation wavelength in graphite-like materials
 Density functional theory of laser-induced freezing in colloidal suspensions
 Experimental study of the decomposition of Y 1 Ba 2 Cu 3 O 7− x into tetragonaland orthorhombic phases
 Structure of poly (propyl ether imine) dendrimer from fully atomistic molecular dynamics simulation and by small angle x-ray scattering
 Pressure behaviour of single wall carbon nanotube bundles and fullerenes: A Raman study
 Second-order Raman scattering by confined optical phonons and interface vibrational modes in GaAs-AlAs superlattices
 Growth of CdS x Se 1-x nanoparticles in glass matrix by isochronal thermal annealing: confined acoustic phonons and optical absorption studies
 Resonance Raman scattering in GaAs-Al x Ga 1-x As superlattices: Impurity-induced Fröhlich-interaction scattering
 Binding of nucleobases with single-walled carbon nanotubes: Theory and experiment
 Reentrant phase transition in charged colloidal suspensions
 Structure and vibrational properties of carbon tubules

Sood has delivered keynote addresses at many seminars such as:

 1998 – Platinum Jubilee Lecture – Indian Science Congress
 2000 – Prof. K. Rangadhama Rao Memorial Award Lecture – Indian National Science Academy
 2003 – Brahm Prakash Memorial Lecture – Indian Institute of Metals, Kalpakkam Chapter
 2004 – James William McBain Award Lecture – National Chemical Laboratory, Pune
 2004 – A. V. Rama Rao Award Lecture – Indian Association of Cultivation of Science, Kolkatta
 2009 – Platinum Jubilee Lecture – Indian Science Congress
 2009 – Prof. Meghnad Saha Memorial Lecture Award – The National Academy of Sciences
 2010–11 – DAE-C. V. Raman Lecture – Indian Physics Association
 2011 – Erudite Scholar – M. G. University, Kottayam

Patents
Sood holds 7 patents, based on his research and experiment findings.

See also

 Graphene
 Soft matter
 Raman scattering
 Nanotechnology
 Indian Institute of Science
 Jawaharlal Nehru Centre for Advanced Scientific Research

References

Further reading

External links
 
 
 
 
 
 

1951 births
Living people
Recipients of the Padma Shri in science & engineering
People from Gwalior
Scientists from Madhya Pradesh
20th-century Indian physicists
Recipients of the Shanti Swarup Bhatnagar Prize for Science and Technology
Indian nanotechnologists
Academic staff of the Indian Institute of Science
Fellows of the Royal Society
TWAS laureates
Indian patent holders